Robert W. Hill (20 September 1828 – 16 July 1909) was an American architect from Waterbury, Connecticut. He was one of Connecticut's most important 19th century architects.

Life and career
Robert Wakeman Hill was born in Waterbury of September 20, 1828, to Samuel and Polly (Brackett) Hill. He attended the public schools, after which he went to New Haven to study architecture. He first attended the Young Men's Institute, where he learned architectural drawing. He obtained a position in the office of Henry Austin, during which he also taught at the YMI. At one point he was also employed by Sidney Mason Stone. He then worked in Milwaukee, Wisconsin for Albert C. Nash, a former Connecticut architect. In 1858 he returned to Connecticut, establishing himself as an architect in the town of Naugatuck. In 1863 he relocated to Waterbury, where he would quickly become the city's most prominent architect, a position he retained for the rest of his career.

Legacy
Hill trained several other Waterbury architects, including Joseph A. Jackson, Wilfred E. Griggs and Theodore B. Peck. At least five buildings designed by him have been placed on the National Register of Historic Places, and many others contribute to listed historic districts.

Works
 1865 - St. Margaret's School, 88 Cooke St, Waterbury, Connecticut
 Demolished.
 1866 - John Kendrick House, 119 W Main St, Waterbury, Connecticut
 Often attributed to Hill or his teacher, Henry Austin.
 1866 - Warren House, 110 Woodbury Rd, Watertown, Connecticut
 Later the Taft School's main building. Demolished.
 1869 - Christ Episcopal Church (Bethlehem, Connecticut) (remodeling), Main St S, Bethlehem, Connecticut
 1869 - Opera House Block, 100 Main St, Ansonia, Connecticut
 1869 - Waterbury City Hall (former), 55 W Main St, Waterbury, Connecticut
 Burned in 1912.
 1870 - Post Office Block, 1 W Main St, New Britain, Connecticut
 1871 - Edward M. Chapin House, 25 Church St, New Hartford, Connecticut
 1871 - Soldiers' Monument, Woodbury Common, Woodbury, Connecticut
 1874 - First Congregational Church Centennial Chapel, 251 Main St, East Haven, Connecticut
 1878 - Albert C. Peck House, 8 Mountain Rd, Woodbury, Connecticut
 1879 - Bronson B. Tuttle House, 380 Church St, Naugatuck, Connecticut
1879 - William H. Anderson House, Andover Street, [Lowell, Massachusetts] ** Demolished.
 1880 - New Britain Opera House, 466-468 Main St, New Britain, Connecticut
 Demolished.
 1880 - Winsted Real Estate Building, 13-17 Park Pl W, Winsted, Connecticut
 1881 - Coe Brass Office Building, 179 Water St, Torrington, Connecticut
 1882 - Welton Street School (former), 36 Welton St, Waterbury, Connecticut
 1882 - Thomaston Fire Station, Main St, Thomaston, Connecticut
 1883 - Hall Memorial Chapel, Riverside Cemetery, Waterbury, Connecticut
 1883 - Thomaston Town Hall and Opera House, 153 Main St, Thomaston, Connecticut
 1883 - Waterbury Armory, Phoenix Ave, Waterbury, Connecticut
 Demolished.
 1883 - Watertown Library (former), 50 DeForest St, Watertown, Connecticut
 Now owned by the Taft School.
 1884 - Griggs Building, 221-227 Bank St, Waterbury, Connecticut
 1885 - Bridgeport Armory, 1494 Main St, Bridgeport, Connecticut
 Highly altered.
 1885 - Rectory for St. John's Episcopal Church, 21 Church St, Waterbury, Connecticut
 1886 - Ansonia Station, 40 W Main St, Ansonia, Connecticut
 Demolished.
 1886 - New Britain Armory (former), 10 Grand St, New Britain, Connecticut
 1886 - Norwalk Armory, Connecticut Ave, Norwalk, Connecticut
 Demolished.
 1887 - Congregational Parish House, Division St, Naugatuck, Connecticut
 1888 - Litchfield County Courthouse, 15 West St, Litchfield, Connecticut
 Altered.
 1889 - Police Department Headquarters, Leavenworth St, Waterbury, Connecticut
 Demolished.
 1890 - Soldiers' Memorial Tower, Memorial Park, Winsted, Connecticut
 With George Edwin Bissell, sculptor.
 1891 - Berlin Free Library (former), Worthington Ridge, Berlin, Connecticut
 Demolished in 1955.
 1891 - Conway (Yankee Pedlar) Inn, 95 Main St, Torrington, Connecticut
 1891 - Litchfield Fire Station (former), 40 West St, Litchfield, Connecticut

Gallery

References

1828 births
1909 deaths
Architects from Waterbury, Connecticut
19th-century American architects
Burials at Riverside Cemetery (Waterbury, Connecticut)